Vaidehi is an Indian Tamil-language family drama and soap opera television series that aired Monday through Friday on Jaya TV from 9 September 2013 to  14 February 2014 for 109 episodes. It had been receiving the highest ratings of Tamil serials and received high praising from viewers.

The show starred Abbas, Neenu Karthika, Baby Jena, Nalini, Srithika, Gowasal and Sridhar among others. It was produced by Shankaran and Paranitharan, director by Bashir and Meha V. Saikumar.

Cast

Main cast

 Abbas
 Neenu Karthika
 Baby Jena
 Srithika
 Nalini

Additional cast

 Gowasal 
 Sridhar
 Dev Aanath
 Azhagu
 Tamil
 Shopnam
 Sri Latha
 Sudha
 Durga
 Sujatha
 Baby Pushitha
 Baby Anu Sri

Title song
The theme song was written by lyricist Na. Muthukumar.

Soundtrack

Airing history 
The show started airing on Jaya TV on 9 September 2013 and ended on 14 February 2014.

References

External links
official website 
Vaidehi Serial on Youtube

Jaya TV television series
Tamil-language children's television series
2013 Tamil-language television series debuts
Tamil-language television shows
2014 Tamil-language television series endings